Botke is a surname. Notable people with the surname include:

Cornelis Botke (1887–1954), Dutch-born American painter and etcher
Jessie Arms Botke (1883–1971), American painter